Alexander Enberg (born April 5, 1972) is an American actor and film producer. He is sometimes credited as Alex Enberg.

Biography
Enberg is the son of television screenwriter and producer Jeri Taylor and sportscaster Dick Enberg.

Career

Actor
Enberg has played young Vulcan engineers on two Star Trek series: Taurik on Star Trek: The Next Generation (TNG) and Vorik on Star Trek: Voyager. He also played the reporter on the TNG episode "Time's Arrow", and the non-canon Crewman Austin Chang in Star Trek: Voyager – Elite Force and Star Trek: Elite Force II. He guest starred in the episode "I’ve Got A Crush On You" of Lois & Clark.

In 2007, Enberg played the role of Jason, the crazy theater director, in the independent feature film, Never Say Macbeth.

Special effects designer
In 2006, Enberg designed the special effects for a short film, Fartman: Caught in a Tight Ass, which aired on Howard TV, Howard Stern's iN Demand Cable Channel, and can now be seen on Atom Films.

In 2007, Enberg also designed the special effects for Never Say Macbeth.

References

External links
 
Fartman: Caught in a Tight Ass Film on AtomFilms
Never Say Macbeth Official Site

1972 births
Living people
American male television actors